Christopher Madzokere (born 13 July 1954) is a Zimbabwean sprinter. He competed in the men's 200 metres at the 1984 Summer Olympics.

References

1954 births
Living people
Athletes (track and field) at the 1984 Summer Olympics
Zimbabwean male sprinters
Olympic athletes of Zimbabwe
Athletes (track and field) at the 1982 Commonwealth Games
Commonwealth Games competitors for Zimbabwe
World Athletics Championships athletes for Zimbabwe
Place of birth missing (living people)